Hindoli Legislative Assembly constituency is one of the 200 Legislative Assembly constituencies of Rajasthan state in India.

It is part of Bundi district.

Members of the Legislative Assembly

Election results

2018

See also
 List of constituencies of the Rajasthan Legislative Assembly
 Bundi district

References

Bundi district
Assembly constituencies of Rajasthan